Mashashita (المشاشطة) is a village in Libya about  west of Tripoli. It is known for olive trees, palm trees, and some vegetables. The town has a mosque, called Salem Almashat Mosque, which is estimated to be 400 years old. Mashashita is located within the administrative district of Tripoli.

Populated places in Tripoli District, Libya